Found objects are sometimes used in music, often to add unusual percussive elements to a work. Their use in such contexts is as old as music itself, as the original invention of musical instruments almost certainly developed from the sounds of natural objects rather than from any specifically designed instruments.

Use in classical and experimental music
The use of found objects in modern classical music is often connected to experiments in indeterminacy and aleatoric music by such composers as John Cage and Karlheinz Stockhausen, although it has reached its ascendancy in those areas of popular music as well, such as the ambient works of Brian Eno. In Eno's influential work, found objects are credited on many tracks.  The ambient music movement which followed Eno's lead has also made use of such sounds, with notable exponents being performers such as Future Sound of London and Autechre, and natural sounds have also been incorporated into many pieces of new-age music.  Also other builders like Yuri Landman, Harry Partch (for example his famous cloud chamber bowl instrument), Pierre Bastien, Iner Souster often incorporate found material in their works. Erik Satie's Parade is also an example of this unconventional type of compositional practice.

Use in popular music
Einstürzende Neubauten became known for incorporating a wide range of found objects in their percussion gear. A more recent example of found objects being used as percussion instruments is Shawn "Clown" Crahan from the nu metal band Slipknot, who beats a beer keg with a baseball bat to the beat of the song. The Dodos also played a garbage bin as a part of their percussion gear. Wall of Voodoo drummer Joe Nanini would commonly use pots and pans instead of conventional drums. Many street drummers perform with empty plastic baskets.

The band Neptune uses VCR-casings, scrap metal and all kinds of other found objects to create experimental musical instruments.

Found objects have occasionally been featured in very well known pop songs: "You Still Believe In Me" from the Beach Boys' Pet Sounds features bicycle bells and horns as part of the orchestral arrangements.

Found sounds
The use of found objects in music takes one of two general forms: either objects are deliberately recorded, with their sound used directly or in processed form, or previous recordings are sampled for use as part of a work (the latter often being referred to simply as "found sound" or "sampling"). With the improvement and easy accessibility of sampling technology since the 1980s, this second method has flourished and is a major component of much modern popular music, particularly in such genres as hip hop.

Examples
 Great Stalacpipe Organ

See also
 Experimental musical instrument
 Sampling (music)
 Sound collage

References

Further reading
Martin J. Junker: Buchhaltung – Percussion octet with books. Norsk Musikforlag, Oslo 2011

Martin J. Junker: Pop up! – Percussion octet (quartet) for pop-up garden waste bags. Gretel-Verlag, Dinklage 2021    http://www.gretel-verlag.de/de/index.htm

Musical techniques
Found object
Experimental music

no:Objet trouvé